John Kingston may refer to:
John Kingston (Australian politician) (born 1935), member of the Legislative Assembly of Queensland
John Kingston (MP), for Devizes 1406
John Kingston (1736-1820), Member of Parliament for Lymington (UK Parliament constituency), 1802-1814
John Kingston Jr. (1860–1898), member of the Wisconsin State Senate 1891–1893
John Kingston (linguist), American linguist
John Ortell Kingston (1919–1987), leader of the Latter Day Church of Christ of Mormon fundamentalists in Davis County, Utah
John E. Kingston (1925–1996), member of the New York State Assembly
John T. Kingston (1819–1899), member of the Wisconsin State Senate and Assembly
John Kingston III (born 1965), investor and candidate for United States Senator from Massachusetts
Jack Kingston (born 1955), former U.S. representative for Georgia
John Kingston (publisher) (1769–1824), Methodist minister, publisher and author
John de Kingston, English knight
John Kingston (rugby union) (born 1960), rugby union coach and player